The AEG PE (Panzer Einsitzer – "armoured one-seater") was a triplane ground-attack aircraft of World War I, one of the first aircraft designed from the outset for that role. The Idflieg  rejected it on the grounds that its poor maneuverability made it too vulnerable to enemy fighters.

Specifications (AEG PE)

See also

References

PE
Single-engined tractor aircraft
1910s German attack aircraft
Triplanes
Aircraft first flown in 1918